Mary Lee Wheat Gray (born April 8, 1938) is an American mathematician, statistician, and lawyer. She is the author of books and papers in the fields of mathematics, mathematics education, computer science, applied statistics, economic equity, discrimination law, and academic freedom. She is currently on the Board of Advisers for POMED (Project on Middle East Democracy)  and is the chair of the Board of Directors of AMIDEAST (America-Mideast Educational and Training Services, Inc.).

Biography and career 
Gray completed her undergraduate degree from Hastings College and her Ph.D. in mathematics from the University of Kansas. She also completed her J.D. from Washington College of Law. She is a member of the District of Columbia and U.S. Supreme Court bars.

Gray was one of the founding members of the Association for Women in Mathematics (AWM) and the first President of the AWM from 1971 to 1973. As reported in A Brief History of the Association for Women in Mathematics: The Presidents' Perspectives, by Lenore Blum, "As Judy Green remembers (and Chandler Davis, early AWM friend, concurs): 'The formal idea of women getting together and forming a caucus was first made publicly at a MAG [Mathematics Action Group] meeting in 1971 ... in Atlantic City. Joanne Darken, then an instructor at Temple University and now at the Community College of Philadelphia, stood up at the meeting and suggested that the women present remain and form a caucus. I have been able to document six women who remained: me (I was a graduate student at Maryland at the time), Joanne Darken, Mary [W.] Gray (she was already at American University), Diane Laison (then an instructor at Temple), Gloria Olive (a Senior Lecturer at the University of Otago, New Zealand, who was visiting the U.S. at the time) and Annie Selden...It's not absolutely clear what happened next, except that I've personally always thought that Mary was responsible for getting the whole thing organized ....'". Mary W. Gray was the early organizer, placing an advertisement in the February 1971 Notices of the AMS, and writing the first issue of the AWM Newsletter that May. Again as reported by Lenore Blum, "What I remember hearing about Mary [W.] Gray and the Atlantic City Meetings, indeed what perked my curiosity, was an entirely different event, one that was also to alter dramatically the character of the mathematics community. In those years the AMS was governed by what could only be called an "old boys network," closed to all but those in the inner circle. Mary challenged that by sitting in on the Council meeting in Atlantic City. When she was told she had to leave, she refused saying she would wait until the police came. (Mary relates the story somewhat differently: When she was told she had to leave, she responded she could find no rules in the by-laws restricting attendance at Council meetings. She was then told it was by "gentlemen's agreement." Naturally Mary replied "Well, obviously I'm no gentleman.") After that time, Council meetings were open to observers and the process of democratization of the Society had begun." A Brief History of the Association for Women in Mathematics: The Presidents' Perspectives dedicates a chapter to Mary W. Gray titled "Mary Gray (1971-1973): The mother of us all".

She worked closely with her AU colleague, chemist Nina Roscher to improve resources for women and minorities in mathematics and science and prevent them from dropping classes. They created an apprenticeship program to help show first year female students an interdisciplinary, people-oriented perspective of scientists. The program, funded by a $95,000 grant from the National Science Foundation (NSF) included a seminar course followed by a two-month apprenticeship working with a scientist engaged in science policy work.

Honors
On July 30, 2017, when Gray received (from the American Statistical Association) the Karl E. Peace Award for Outstanding Statistical Contributions for the Betterment of Society (Paul S. Albert, chair), this was the written citation: "For the innovative use of statistics for fighting discrimination through the promotion of equality and human rights; for legal advocacy in court cases; and for leadership in multiple societies, including as first president of the Association for Women in Mathematics and chair of the American Middle East Educational and Training Services." And, this was the spoken citation: "The winners of the 2017 Karl E. Peace award for Outstanding Statistical Contributions for the Betterment of Society reflect ways that statistical thinking in action can make important scientific and societal impact.  The first is using statistics to directly inform policy and improve society, and the second is developing new statistical methodology that translates to the betterment of society.  Dr. Mary Gray, trained as both a statistician and a lawyer, has made important contributions in the application of statistics in human rights, economic equality, legal issues, and education.  She is the founder and first president of the Association for Women in Mathematics and chair of the American Middle East Education and Training Services. Dr. Gray is a fellow of the American Statistical Association and the American Association for the Advancement of Science, and is the recipient of the Presidential Award for Excellence in Science, Engineering and Mathematics Mentoring.  She is the author of two books and over eighty articles and has lectured throughout the United States, Europe, Latin America, and the Middle East, on these important topics."

Gray has received the Presidential Award for Excellence in Science, Engineering, and Mathematics Mentoring from President George W. Bush. She has also received honorary degrees from the University of Nebraska, Mount Holyoke College, and Hastings College. She is a fellow of the American Mathematical Society, The American Statistical Association, the American Association for the Advancement of Science, and the Association for Women in Science.

In 2017, Gray was selected as a fellow of the Association for Women in Mathematics in the inaugural class. In 2021, she was awarded the MAA Certificate of Merit.

Published works

Books

Journal articles
Gray has published over 80 articles.

Awards
1959 Fulbright Fellowship
1959-1963 NDEA fellowship 
1963-1964 NSF fellowship
1994 Mentor Award for Lifetime Achievement from the American Association for the Advancement of Science
1979 Georgina Smith Award from the American Association of University Professors for her work on the status of women in collective bargaining
2001 Presidential Award for Excellence in Science, Engineering and Mathematics Mentoring
2012 Elizabeth L. Scott Award from the Committee of Presidents of Statistical Societies
2017 Karl E. Peace Award for Outstanding Statistical Contributions for the Betterment of Society

Memberships
Chair of the Board of Directors of the American Middle East Education Foundation
Statistics Without Borders
Co-director of the Patricia Roberts Harris Fellowship program at American University
President of the Association for Women in Mathematics, 1971–1973
American Association for the Advancement of Science: Chair of Committee on Scientific Freedom and Responsibility, 1997 - 1999

References

Further reading
A Brief History of the Association for Women in Mathematics: The Presidents' Perspectives
Notable Women in Mathematics, a Biographical Dictionary, edited by Charlene Morrow and Teri Perl, Greenwood Press, 1998. pp 71–76

External links

Mary Gray at American University
"Mary Gray", Biographies of Women Mathematicians, Agnes Scott College
Mary Lee Wheat Gray, Mathematics Genealogy Project

1939 births
Living people
20th-century American mathematicians
21st-century American mathematicians
American statisticians
American women mathematicians
Women statisticians
Hastings College alumni
University of Kansas alumni
Washington College of Law alumni
American University faculty and staff
Fellows of the American Statistical Association
Fellows of the American Mathematical Society
Fellows of the Association for Women in Mathematics
20th-century women mathematicians
21st-century women mathematicians
20th-century American women
21st-century American women